The 2012–13 Pakistan Premier League was the 9th season of the Pakistan Premier League, the Pakistani professional league for association football clubs, since its establishment in 2004. The season began on 5 September 2012 and ended on 15 January 2013.

Khan Research Laboratories were the defending champions, having won their second Premier League title the previous season. This was their second top division league title.

On 13 January 2013, Khan Research Laboratories won their third Premier League title and Pakistani titles after drawing 0–0 with Pakistan Airlines at KPT Stadium.

Kaleemullah Khan became the first player to score 30+ goals in a Pakistan Premier League season, after scoring 35 goals.

Format
Teams play each other on a home and away basis

The winners will represent Pakistan at the 2013 AFC President's Cup. The bottom two teams will be relegated to the Pakistan Football Federation League.

Teams
Pakistan Police and Pak Elektron were relegated at the end of the 2011–12 season and were replaced by Wohaib and Zarai Taraqiati.

The Pakistan Navy on the other hand have vacated their previous home ground, the Municipal Stadium in Rawalpindi for the Karachi Port Trust Stadium in Karachi due to the former ground having various issues with the pitch condition, thus KPT Stadium will be used by three teams this season, other two being Karachi Port Trust and National Bank, both has used KPT Stadium as their home ground since the start of Pakistan Premier League.

Location and stadia

League table

Fixtures and results

Statistics

Scoring
First goal of the season: Sajjad Ahmed for Pakistan Navy against Karachi Port Trust (5 September 2012).
Last goal of the season: Muhammad Adnan for Pakistan Navy against Khan Research Laboratories (14 January 2013).
Fastest goal of the season: 59 seconds – Abdus Salam for Karachi Electric Supply Corporation against WAPDA (14 January 2013).
Most hat-trick by a single player: 7
Kaleemullah Khan
Largest winning margin: 6 goals
Habib Bank 6–0 Wohaib (28 December 2012)
Highest scoring game: 10 goals
Karachi Port Trust 4–6 Karachi Electric Supply Corporation (11 December 2012)
Most goals scored in a match by a single team: 6 goals
Habib Bank 6–0 Wohaib (28 December 2012)
Karachi Port Trust 4–6 Karachi Electric Supply Corporation (11 December 2012)
Most goals scored in a match by a losing team: 4 goals
Karachi Port Trust 4–6 Karachi Electric Supply Corporation (11 December 2012)

Top scorers

Hat-tricks

4 Player scored four goals

Awards

References

Pakistan Premier League seasons
1
Pakistan